Myja karin is a species of sea slug, an aeolid nudibranch, a marine gastropod mollusc in the family Facelinidae.

Distribution
A second specimen was included in the original description, from Uchiura, Ishikawa.

Description 
Myja karin is a slender nudibranch with unusual elongate cerata which mimic the polyps of its hydroid prey, Pennaria. Although found together at the same site, this species and Myja hyotan differ in shape of the cerata, details of colouration, anatomy and molecular distances.

References 

Facelinidae